The dinaric calcareous silver fir forests are an endemic vegetation type of the littoral Dinaric Alps, located in the Dinaric Mountains mixed forests ecoregion in southeastern Europe. Pure stands of dinaric calcareous silver fir (Abies alba) forests appear on limestone escarpments in the montane zones of Orjen, Velebit, Biokovo and Prenj. They comprise one of the most interesting formations of Balkan vegetation types as the forests bear several rare plants and are of striking beauty. As a highly endemic and rare vegetation type of the dinarids, it needs protection.

Structure
Dinaric calcareous silver fir forests have an open structure which is environmentally sensible. As storms of bora and scirocco type are common on the coastal dinaric mountains, wind plays a great role in the formation of the highly labile structure in the pure silver fir communities.

Distribution
Dinaric calcareous silver fir forests are dispersed in smaller patches on the hypercarstic littoral karst mountain environments of the dinarids. The abundance of precipitation on these coastal mountains of up to 5000 mm/m2a with the dry soil conditions restricts these pure silver fir forests to the most rainy and humid spots of the dinarids.

Ecology
Silver fir is a constituent of montane central European forests. As a rare species in dry climates of the Mediterranean, the silver firs presence on Mt. Orjen are restricted to humid northern slopes. A marked difference in the fir's vegetation patterns is seen here. It has a common cause in soil formation. High soil-water content in terrae fuscae on glacial superstratum leads to beech-fir forests, whereas dry initial rendzinas on glacio-karstic substrate support xeric dinaric calcareous silver fir forests. The latter endemic community rich in submediterranean species has evolutionary parallels with Bosnian Pine communities.

Floristic composition
Dinaric calcareous silver fir forests are among the most species-rich montane ecosystems in the Dinaric Alps. 

Mixed deciduous-silver fir peony (Paeonia daurica Andrews)-forests with Paeonia daurica''' have the most species rich composition found so far on Orjen (Abies alba, Corylus colurna, Fraxinus excelsior, Fagus sylvatica, Acer intermedium, Tilia cordata, Acer pseudoplatanus, Pinus heldreichii).'' 

* 
Syntaxonomic chart of mixed deciduous-silver fir-peony forest at Orjen

Plant list
 

Typical plants of the many times dry basic Kalkomelasol soil plant Biotope:
C. OREOHERZOGIO-ABIETALIA Fuk. 1969
a) O r e o h e r z o g i o-A b i e t i o n Ht. emend. Fuk.
1. Oreoherzogio-Abietetum Fuk.

Literature
 Pavle Cikovac: Sociology and ecology of silver fir forests on Mt. Orjen - Montenegro. LMU Munich 2002, Department of Geography

Dinaric Mountains mixed forests
Lists of biota of Europe
Lists of plants
Flora of Southeastern Europe
Temperate coniferous forests
Forests of Croatia